Commander Venus was an American emo band from Omaha, Nebraska. Fronted by Conor Oberst and Tim Kasher, the band also included Todd Fink and Matt Bowen of The Faint, Ben Armstrong of Head of Femur and Robb Nansel, executive producer of the indie label Saddle Creek. Kasher subsequently went on to front the band Cursive, and Oberst later became famous as the core member of the indie folk collective Bright Eyes, and later the punk band Desaparecidos.

They recorded two albums, Do You Feel at Home? on Saddle Creek and The Uneventful Vacation, on Grass Records, which became Wind-up Records, that ultimately licensed the CD to Thick Records.

History

Shortly after his two solo recordings, Conor Oberst (guitar, vocals) began playing with Tim Kasher (bass) and Matt Bowen (drums) to form Commander Venus the summer before Oberst's freshman year at Creighton Prep. "I didn't know how to play with a band at all," he says. "I couldn't keep in time with the drums." Robb Nansel, who runs Saddle Creek Records, also joined the band on guitar.

In 1995, they released Do You Feel at Home? on their own label, Saddle Creek. They were later signed to Grass Records for whom they recorded The Uneventful Vacation in July 1997. The story of how the second album was recorded, and the band's dealings with Wind-up Records management, is one of carefree excess. The Uneventful Vacation cost $15,000 to record, a staggering sum for an indie album.

"They bought us a van and sent us on these tours. They had all this money and didn't know how to run a record label. The new management all came from a major label and knew nothing about underground music. It was a zoo, they didn't know what was going on and didn't have the know-how to make something happen."

Despite the money thrown at the project, Oberst considers The Uneventful Vacation — a loud, sometimes brash alt-rock album that still manages to encompass Oberst's awkward but powerful personal music style — to be "somewhat of a failure musically. We wanted to do stuff we weren't prepared to do because I'm not a very good guitar player. That's always been my biggest problem."

The project also was rushed, having to be recorded during summer vacation. Despite all that, the record received college airplay, as well as positive critical nods, including a Scratch (magazine) review that said, "If Commander Venus is any indication of what's to come from the second generation of indie rock, then the future looks bright indeed." The hot rumor was that Commander Venus could be "the next big thing" out of Omaha. The rumor was wrong.

"First, Matt quit. He was frustrated; he didn't want to play drums. Then Tim had to make a decision, because Cursive was really picking up at the time and he was their main guy. We knew it would come to this point where we'd both be touring at the same time, so he bowed out."

The band continued for another nine months with Todd Baechle on bass and Ben Armstrong on drums. They toured the East Coast, but Oberst began to feel penned in by the band. "It lost its luster and I got fed up with the big 'emo music' craze. We got tagged as an emo band right off the bat. A lot of cool bands were playing that style of music, then a huge number of bands started tagging along, and suddenly everyone was getting thrown in the emo category. These days, I think of emo as a negative term."

Discography

Albums
Do You Feel at Home? (1995; CD & LP on Saddle Creek)
The Uneventful Vacation (1997; CD THICK Records, LP on Saddle Creek)

Singles
Music Me All Over (1997; 7" split with Lux-O-Values, Norman Bailer & Weld on Saddle Creek)
Some Songs (1996; 7" split with Drip on Saddle Creek & Ghostmeat Records)

Compilations
Apollo's Salvage (1995; CD on Ghostmeat Records; features the song "Pay Per View")
Saddle Creek Records, A Sampler (1998; CD on Saddle Creek; featured the songs "Bent on Broken Nerves" & "Waiting for Enoch Arden")

See also
Bright Eyes (band)
Cursive (band)
Head of Femur (band)

References

External links
Commander Venus at Ghostmeat Records
Thick Records
Wind Up Records
Saddle Creek Records

Conor Oberst
Indie rock musical groups from Nebraska
Musical groups from Omaha, Nebraska
Saddle Creek Records artists
American emo musical groups
1995 establishments in Nebraska